Pavard is a French surname. Notable people with the surname include:

 Benjamin Pavard (born 1996), French footballer
 René Pavard (born 1934), French racing cyclist

See also
 Havard

French-language surnames